Tortolì Airport, also known as Tortolì-Arbatax airport (IATA: TTB, ICAO: LIET) is a regional airport, located in the Province of Nuoro, in central east of Sardinia, Italy. It is located 140 km from Cagliari and 100 km from Nuoro and operated by Gestione Aeroporto di Tortolì S.p.A. (Ge.Ar.To).

History
The airport was built in the 60's, with a grass runway, as logistical and technical support for the near Arbatax paper mill. The mill closed in 1986. In 1975, a  asphalt runway, a hangar and a control tower were built.

Between 1986 and 1990, regional airline Air Sardinia managed the airport, offering flights to Olbia, Alghero and Cagliari and charters outside of Sardinia.

The airfield closed in 1990. In 1993, a group of local entrepreneurs built a terminal and offered seasonal charter flights (June, July, September, October) with regional airlines with aircraft such as BAe 146, Bombardier Q400 and ATR72. Annual traffic reached 44,412 passengers in 1998 and 42,655 in 2004.
 

In 2021, the Industrial Consortium, owner of the Aliarbatax company which holds 100% of the airport's shares, started plans to obtain authorisation from ENAC to reopen the airport for general aviation, with aircraft not exceeding 5700 kg MTOW and 12 passengers, in summer 2021. Initial plans for 2022 included the airport to offer commercial flights on aircraft up to 100 seats.

On 28 April 2022, ENAC gave the authorisation to reopen the airport for general aviation while plans to offer flights on 100-seat aircraft were moved into summer 2023.

Airlines and destinations
There are currently (May 2021) no scheduled services to and from Tortolì Airport.

Statistics

References

Airports in Sardinia
Tortolì